Caleb is a fictional character played by Nathan Fillion in the television series Buffy the Vampire Slayer created by Joss Whedon. The character is a sadistic sociopath with a pathological hatred of women.

According to Whedon, the character was introduced because the mutable, non-corporeal nature of the First Evil "meant that we didn't have anything to push against. We needed... a sidekick. Somebody physical that we can see from episode to episode." Whedon describes him as "the creepiest priest", adding, "he is the most bald-faced misogynist we've had since, well, since last year, with Warren."

Character biography
Before becoming the right-hand man of the First Evil, Caleb was a defrocked priest and serial killer responsible for the deaths of at least two girls, whom he lured with his sermons, charm, and handsomeness.

Despite not appearing until the last five episodes of the series, the character is revealed to be one of the prime movers for the events of the seventh season. In an effort to eliminate all threats to the First Evil's resurgence, he directs hordes of Bringers to systematically kill Potential Slayers around the world. He also orders the bombing of the Watchers' Council Headquarters in London, causing the deaths of Quentin Travers and all Watchers and Council Operatives present, and arranges for a fellow prisoner to attack Faith in a Los Angeles prison.

In the episode "Dirty Girls", Caleb attacks the Scooby Gang in person. He murders two potential Slayers (one being Molly; one of the first potentials to appear in the series), breaks the arm of another (Rona) and effortlessly defeats Buffy, Faith, and Spike. Before the Gang retreats, he also violently blinds Xander in one eye by forcing his thumb into his left eye socket.

The character dies in the last two episodes of the series. In "End of Days" and "Chosen", Buffy, with the assistance of the newly arrived Angel, kills Caleb in a final confrontation. With Angel watching, Buffy pierces Caleb's abdomen with the Scythe, apparently killing him. Much to their shock, Caleb is revived with another power transfusion from the First Evil and immediately knocks Angel unconscious with a devastating blow. Buffy and Caleb resume their fight. However, Caleb's injuries weaken him. In the end, Buffy cuts Caleb in half vertically, from his crotch to his torso, actually castrating him and finally killing him. Angel comes ready to fight Caleb and discovers him cleaved, Buffy quips "he had to split", and both share a much-deserved laugh.

Powers and abilities
The character Caleb provided a villain with a physical threat (in contrast to the non-corporeal First Evil), and a recognizable counterweight to Buffy and her allies.

The character's body serves as a vessel for the superhuman power of the non-corporeal First Evil. The First makes him the commander of its campaign of carnage and mayhem. Caleb likes to re-enact his killings by asking The First to take on the form of the girls he's killed, so he may "kill them again". Except of Glory and Olvikan, Caleb's strength dwarfs most of Buffy's previous adversaries. When channeling the power of the First Evil, he possesses immense physical strength and durability, greatly exceeding that of most vampires, demons, and Slayers. He effortlessly defeats the combined might of Buffy, Faith, and Spike in their first encounter. In order to maintain this power, Caleb must merge with The First to recharge after extended periods. Power transfusions from The First also allow Caleb the ability to return from death, as long as his body is still intact.

Beliefs
The character periodically delivers quasi-biblical quotes, even frequently making allusions to his belief that the First Evil is actually God, or even superior to God. When The First, in the guise of Buffy, asks him if he thinks it is God, Caleb replies he believes The First is beyond such definition. He states plainly in his debut episode, "I don't truck with Satan, that was just me havin' fun. Satan is a little man." Caleb also comments further on his admiration of The First, when it (under the guise of Buffy) vocalizes its envy of humans' ability to feel lust and engage in primal sexual acts, while several members of the Scooby Gang engage in such activity elsewhere. He dismisses them all as "sinners," commenting enthusiastically that The First is miles beyond that, for it is "sin" itself. The character quotes the Old Testament more often than the New Testament. For example, the character's misogynistic views are expressed through the story of Adam, Eve, and the forbidden fruit. When asked about the character's religious connections, Whedon said, "I'm not coming down against priests. This guy clearly is not one."

Writing and acting
 Caleb was referred to by Buffy writers as "The Second," a reference to his boss' nickname, "The First."

Appearances
Caleb appears in:

Buffy the Vampire Slayer
Caleb appeared as a guest in 5 episodes:
Season 7 – "Dirty Girls"; "Empty Places"; "Touched"; "End of Days"; "Chosen"

Buffy the Vampire Slayer Season Eight
Caleb appeared in a dream in the e-comic "Always Darkest".

See also
 List of Buffyverse villains and supernatural beings

References

Buffy the Vampire Slayer characters
Fictional priests and priestesses
Television characters introduced in 2003
Fictional commanders
Fictional henchmen
Fictional characters with superhuman strength
Fictional mass murderers
Fictional serial killers
Fictional avatars
Fictional telepaths
Male characters in television
Characters created by Drew Goddard

sv:Buffy och vampyrerna#Caleb